The 1825 State of the Union Address was given by John Quincy Adams, the sixth president of the United States.  It was given to the 19th United States Congress, on Tuesday, December 6, 1825.  He said, "In taking a general survey of the concerns of our beloved country, with reference to subjects interesting to the common welfare, the first sentiment which impresses itself upon the mind is of gratitude to the Omnipotent Disposer of All Good for the continuance of the signal blessings of His providence, and especially for that health which to an unusual extent has prevailed within our borders, and for that abundance which in the vicissitudes of the seasons has been scattered with profusion over our land."   He ended with, "And may He who searches the hearts of the children of men prosper your exertions to secure the blessings of peace and promote the highest welfare of your country."

References

1825 documents
State of the Union Address
State of the Union Address
State of the Union Address
December 1825 events
State of the Union
State of the Union addresses
Presidency of John Quincy Adams
Works by John Quincy Adams
19th United States Congress